Henriette de Verninac (1780–1827) was the daughter of Charles-François Delacroix, minister of Foreign Affairs under the Directory, and wife of the diplomat Raymond de Verninac Saint-Maur. She is known as the subject of a portrait by Jacques-Louis David.

Early years

Henriette Delacroix was born in 1780.
Her father was Charles-François Delacroix (or Lacroix), minister of Foreign Affairs under the Directory.
She was the second of four children. Her older brother Charles was a general during the First French Empire.
Her second brother was Henri. 
Her youngest brother was the painter Eugène Delacroix (1798–1863), born eighteen years after her.

Marriage

In 1798 Henriette married Raymond de Verninac-Saint-Maur (1762-1822).
He was one of the three commissioners who had been delegated to settle the annexation of Avignon in 1791.
Raymond de Verninac was Minister to Sweden from 1792 until 1793, when Louis XVI was executed and relations were broken off.
From 1795-97 he was Minister to the Porte of Sultan Selim III.

During the Consulate (1799-1804) Verninac was Prefect of the Rhône department.
The Verninacs moved to Lyon.
Jacques-Louis David painted a portrait of her in 1799.
The sensual painting in neo-classical style depicts Henriette in the classical costume popular during the Directory.
 In 1808 Joseph Chinard sculpted Henriette as Diana the Huntress Preparing Her Arrows.
Both of these works are now held by the Musée du Louvre.

From 1802-05 Raymond de Verninac was French representative to Switzerland, after which he retired from the diplomatic service.
Charles Étienne Raymond Victor de Verninac was born in Paris on 19 November 1803, the couple's only child.
Henriette's father died in November 1805.
Her second brother Henri died in 1807 in the Battle of Friedland.
When her mother, Victoire Oeben, died in 1814 it was found that family estate was fully mortgaged, and his attorney had been stealing from it. 
Rather than being worth 800,000 francs as thought, the estate was in debt by 175,000 francs.

The couple took care of Eugène Delacroix in 1814 after the death of their mother.
Delacroix met his first love at Henriette's house. 
His portrait of the young Englishwoman Elisabeth Salter was painted in 1817.
He became attached to his nephew, Charles, who was just five years younger than him.
When Charles came to Paris to attend the Lycée Louis-le-Grand, Delacroix acted as his informal guardian.

Last years

Henriette's husband died on 23 April 1822.
With the trial over her father's estate not yet settled, 
Henriette was ruined and forced to work to survive.
She offered her services to the house of education of the Legion of Honour.
She died in Paris in 1827.
Delacroix became owner of the painting by David. 
He kept it for the rest of his life.

Notes

Citations

Sources

1780 births
1827 deaths
French artists' models